Paunglin Dam is a dam in the Yangon Division, Burma. It is located near Hlegu, northeast of Yangon.

References

Dams in Myanmar
Buildings and structures in Yangon Region